This type of political party was constructed in June 2004 and sees itself as a "true opposition party." Its leader is a Cambodian-American called Sum Sitha which is its party chairman.

Political ideology

This political party promotes some political ideologies. These are liberal nationalist and conservative  and some socialism. Firstly with the right-wing ideology is trying to responsibly control illegal immigration in order to prevent those illegal immigrants from selling drugs and “smuggling” “drug” and “people.” Sitha believes that “refugees” from Vietnam can come to stay in Cambodia. Though it is difficult to know completely Sitha believes many are working for the Communist regime in Hanoi, Vietnam.

The KNP would also prevent “land grabbing by government officials.” That would mean stopping officials use land that could be used by the rest of Cambodian society for growing vegetables etc.

Political activity
When the party promoted some of its candidates in 8 of 1,621 Cambodian communes it had “problems with the timing with the NEC” (meaning National Election Committee). Another reason the KNP promoted “few candidates was because of disagreement within his party last year”.

References

2004 establishments in Cambodia
Conservative parties in Cambodia
Liberal parties in Cambodia
Nationalist parties in Cambodia
Political parties established in 2004
Political parties in Cambodia
Socialist parties in Cambodia